Jenny Bede (born 1983) is an English comedian. Trained in musical theatre, she has performed since 2008 with a focus on  musical comedy.

Early life
Bede was born in 1983, and grew up in Pinner, London.

Education
Bede trained in musical theatre at the Royal Academy of Music.

Career 
Bede worked as a brain surgeon's PA prior to full-time comedy.

In 2008, Bede first performed at the Edinburgh Festival Fringe, a musical, returning in 2011 to 2014, as double-headers.

In 2010, Bede joined the cast of NewsRevue, a resident musical sketch show, at Canal Cafe Theatre in Little Venice, London.

In 2013, Bede wrote and starred in her first comedy pilot, AAA, for Comedy Feeds, for BBC3.

In 2015, Bede performed Jenny Bede: Don’t Look at Me a show during the Edinburgh Festival Fringe.

In 2017, Bede performed Jenny Bede: Eggtime a show during the Edinburgh Festival Fringe.

In 2019, Bede performed Jenny Bede: The Musical an hour show at Just The Tonic at The Mash House during the Edinburgh Festival Fringe.

In 2022, Bede starred in Prince Andrew: The Musical.

Recognition
In 2013, Bede was the winner of the Musical Comedy Awards Best Newcomer. 

In 2015, Bede was a winner of The Observers rising stars of 2015.

In 2017, Bede was a winner of BAFTA Rocliffe New Writing Award, for her script, Baby.

Further reading

References

External links
 bedey100. Cheryl Cole Vs Run DMC - Her US X-Factor Story (Talk This Way) YouTube, 500K views, 2011-05-30
 

1983 births
Living people
British comedians
British women comedians
Alumni of the Royal Academy of Music